Steve Myhra (April 2, 1934 – August 4, 1994) was a professional American football player who played as a guard, linebacker and kicker for six seasons for the Baltimore Colts.

Football career

After playing at the University of North Dakota, Myhra was drafted in the 12th round of the 1956 NFL Draft by the Colts as an offensive guard and linebacker. In 1957, Myhra became the Colts' placekicker, and was successful on 88% of his extra point attempts (14 of 16) and 4 of 6 on field goals. The next season, Myhra was only 4 for 10 on field goal attempts, which many have speculated may be why Johnny Unitas and the Colts went for the touchdown in overtime of the championship game rather than line up for a game-winning field goal attempt.

Myhra is known for kicking the game-tying field goal for the Baltimore Colts with seven seconds to go in the fourth quarter of the 1958 NFL Championship Game. His field goal pushed the game into overtime, marking the first occasion in professional football history that any game had moved into an extra period. The game was eventually won by the Colts on a touchdown by Alan Ameche, and has since become referred to as "The Greatest Game Ever Played".

Myhra kicked for the Colts for three more seasons. He finished 180 for 189 on extra points, and 41 for 91 on field goal attempts.

Personal
Myhra died of a heart attack in 1994 at age 60.

References

1934 births
1994 deaths
People from Wahpeton, North Dakota
People from Richland County, North Dakota
Players of American football from North Dakota
American football offensive linemen
American football placekickers
North Dakota Fighting Hawks football players
Baltimore Colts players